"Rose Bouquet" is a song co-written and recorded by American country music artist Phil Vassar. It was released in January 2001 as the third single from his debut album, Phil Vassar. The song was written by Vassar and Robert Byrne.

Chart performance
"Rose Bouquet" debuted at number 56 on the U.S. Billboard Hot Country Songs chart for the week of January 20, 2001.

References

2001 singles
2000 songs
Phil Vassar songs
Songs written by Phil Vassar
Arista Nashville singles
Songs written by Robert Byrne (songwriter)
Song recordings produced by Byron Gallimore